HNK Rijeka are a Croatian football club. This article details their record in UEFA club competitions.

History
HNK Rijeka have participated in UEFA competitions on 21 occasions, with 17 appearances since 1999. The club's greatest achievement was the 1978–79 European Cup Winners' Cup quarter–final, where they lost 2–0 on aggregate against Juventus. Among other notable continental successes, Rijeka qualified for the group stage of the UEFA Europa League in two consecutive seasons, in 2013–14 and 2014–15, keeping an undefeated run for 12 consecutive home matches. They also qualified for the group stages in 2017–18 and 2020–21. Rijeka are one of only three Croatian clubs that have qualified for the group stages of UEFA Champions League or Europa League. In 2014–15, Rijeka became the first club from former Yugoslavia to win eight European fixtures in one season. Rijeka faced eventual competition winners on two occasions, Real Madrid in the 1984–85 UEFA Cup and Sevilla in the 2014–15 UEFA Europa League.

Matches in Europe

By competition

Source: uefa.com, Last updated on 28 July 2022.Pld = Matches played; W = Matches won; D = Matches drawn; L = Matches lost; GF = Goals for; GA = Goals against. Defunct competitions indicated in italics.

By ground

Source: uefa.com, Last updated on 28 July 2022.Pld = Matches played; W = Matches won; D = Matches drawn; L = Matches lost; GF = Goals for; GA = Goals against.

By season
Non-UEFA competitions are listed in italics.

Last updated on 28 July 2022.

Records and statistics

Record wins and defeats
 Home win
 5–0 v.  Prestatyn Town, 2013–14, 18 July 2013.
 Away win
 5–1 v.  Víkingur, 2014–15, 31 July 2014.
 5–1 v.  The New Saints, 2017–18, 18 July 2017.
 Home defeat
 0–3 v.  Partizan, 1999–2000, 4 August 1999.
 0–3 v.  Aberdeen, 2015–16, 16 July 2015.
 1–4 v.  Austria Wien, 2017–18, 2 November 2017.
 Away defeat
 0–4 v.  Vitória de Guimarães, 2013–14, 19 September 2013.

Record by country of opposition
Updated on 28 July 2022.

Player and manager statistics
Updated on 28 July 2022.

Players and manager in bold are currently active for Rijeka.

 Most goals in a single match:
 3 goals: 
 Damir Desnica (7 November 1979 v Lokomotíva Košice)
 Leon Benko (18 July 2013 v Prestatyn Town)
 Adis Jahović (7 August 2014 v Víkingur)
 Andrej Kramarić (23 October 2014 v Feyenoord)

UEFA coefficient history (2013–)
Updated on 12 August 2021.

In European football, UEFA coefficients are used to rank and seed teams in club competitions. The coefficients are calculated by UEFA, who administer football within Europe.

2013–2018
Source: Bert Kassies website

2018–

5-year calculation
Source: Bert Kassies website

10-year calculation
Source: Bert Kassies website

References

External links
European Profile – UEFA.com

Europe
Rijeka
Rijeka